The Eastern Air Command is one of the five operational commands of the Indian Air Force. Currently headquartered in Shillong in Meghalaya. Named No. 1 Operational Group at the time of its inception, 27 May 1958, it was based at Ranikutir in Kolkata as a part of the Govt's increasing emphasis on defence of the eastern borders. The Operational Group was upgraded as Command on 1 December 1959 with headquarters at Fort William, Kolkata and Air Vice Marshal KL Sondhi as the first AOC-in-C of the Eastern Command. After the 1962 Indo-Chinese War, The decision was made to raise a full-fledged command at Shillong. The area of responsibility of the command now covers 11 states, and is bound by the international boundaries of Nepal, Bhutan, China, Myanmar and Bangladesh incorporating 6300 km of common border. Eastern Air Command now has permanent airbases at Chabua, Guwahati, Bagdogra, Barrackpore, Hasimara, Jorhat, Kalaikunda and Tezpur with forward airbases at Agartala, Kolkata, Panagarh and Shillong. Eastern Air Command consists of Air Defence squadrons consisting of the MiG-21 and Ground attack squadrons consisting of the MiG-27. It holds the motto "Samareshu Parakramaha" (Lit: Valour in battle),

Activities and responsibilities
The Eastern Air Command has a specific mandate both during peace and war. In war situations, the command is tasked to conduct counter air operations and provides offensive air support to Army and Para-Military Forces. In peace, the command swings into action whenever there is a natural calamity. It was extensively involved in relief operations in the aftermath of the supercyclone in Orissa and has provided relief supplies during floods in Assam and Arunachal Pradesh.

The command has three broad spheres of activity - operations, maintenance and administration. The fighter squadrons under the Eastern Air Command are equipped with MiG variants, and pilots are under continuous training for operational flying.

At Tezpur, located on the northern bank of the Brahmaputra in Upper Assam, newly commissioned ab-initio fighter pilots undergo fighter pilot training and on successful completion get inducted into various fighter squadrons in IAF. Majority of the fighter fleet of Eastern Air Command consists of MiG-21 and the MiG-27 (Bahadur).

The transport aircraft and helicopter of the Eastern Air Command are critical in the North-East India. The topography in the hill regions restrict the construction of a standard runway. Tribal settlements in places like Menchuha, Vijaynagar and Tuting in remote and inaccessible areas of Arunachal Pradesh totally depend on the aerial supply by the Air Force. They also depend on these aircraft to airlift their sick and ailing. The district headquarters at Anini, a conglomeration of about ten tribal settlements with a population of a couple of thousand in Arunachal Pradesh is the only one of its kind in the world which is totally air-maintained.

Pilots operate from the advance landing grounds (ALG) with only one third of the length of a regular runway, having unique and uni-directional approach and take off requirements. This coupled with the vagaries of weather expects superior skills from the pilots and their navigators. Both man and machine are stretched to the limits of their capabilities.

Helicopter operations also form a critical part of the responsibilities of the Easter Air Command. For the pilots who negotiate this remote and inaccessible terrain, the experience gained over the last five decades has been well assimilated. The contribution of Eastern Air Command in bringing relief and in aiding civilian population in times of calamity and strife is an unsung saga of commitment, daring and dedication.

War operations
The Eastern Air Command was a major participant in 1962 Sino-Indian War and the Indo-Pak war of 1971.

During the 1962 war, Eastern Air Command was tasked with mounting transport support missions, a task admirably performed by its Dakota  and Caribou aircraft. It also mounted reconnaissance and casualty evacuation sorties using the Bell and Sikorsky helicopters it operated at the time.

During the 1971 war, Eastern Air Command was tasked with offensive as well as supply operations. It was involved right from the first clash over Boyra to the Tangail Airdrop. It also operated Mi-4 helicopters in offensive roles behind enemy lines, operating from helicopter bases in Tripura.

Organization
Squadrons include (as of 2015):

Air Officer Commanding-in-Chief

Aircraft

Sukhoi Su-30 MKI
Mil Mi-17
Mil Mi-24
Avro 748
An-32

See also
 Indian Air Force
 No. 22 Squadron, Indian Air Force
 Sino-Indian War
 East Pakistan Operations 1971
 Operation Meghdoot
 Orissa Super Cyclone

References

Commands of the Indian Air Force
Military units and formations established in 1958
Military units and formations of the Indian Air Force
1958 establishments in West Bengal